Under The Water-Line is the debut album from the Dutch band Ten Sharp and contains the hit singles "You", "Ain't My Beating Heart" and "Rich Man". The album was released in March 1991 with 7 tracks, but by the time "You" became a national hit the album was expanded in April of the same year with three new songs to make it a full 10-tracks album. The album itself entered the top ten in Norway, Sweden, Austria and Switzerland.

The LP version of this album plays an early version of "Rich Man". This version is half a minute longer.

The song "When the Snow Falls" was previously released as a single in January 1985. The version that appears on the album contains the single version combined with the atmospheric intro of the extended version.

Track listings

1st version (March 1991)
 "You" - 4:34
 "Ain't My Beating Heart" - 4:15
 "When the Spirit Slips Away" - 4:45
 "Ray" - 4:01
 "When the Snow Falls" - 5:15
 "Who Needs Women" - 4:42
 "Lonely Heart" - 4:55

2nd version (April 1991)
 "You" - 4:34
 "When the Spirit Slips Away" - 4:45
 "Rich Man" - 4:14
 "Ain't My Beating Heart" - 4:15
 "Lonely Heart" - 4:55
 "Who Needs Women" - 4:42
 "Some Sails" - 4:16
 "Ray" - 4:01
 "When the Snow Falls" - 5:15
 "Closing Hour" - 3:59
 Japanese bonus track
 "You" (Acoustic)

The Japanese pressing uses the same artwork as the 1st version.

Credits 
 Vocals: Marcel Kapteijn
 Instruments and programming: Niels Hermes
 Produced by Michiel Hoogenboezem & Niels Hermes
 Engineered by Michiel Hoogenboezem
 Saxophone: Tom Barlage
 Guitar on "Rich Man": Hugo de Bruin
 Additional drums on "Rich Man" and "Closing Hour": Rob Jansen
 Horns on "Rich Man": Stylus Horns
 Guitar on "When The Snow Falls": Martin Boers
 Bass on "When The Snow Falls": Ton Groen
 Drums on "When The Snow Falls": Wil Bouwes
 Recorded at Spitsbergen and Wisseloord Studios
 Mixed at Wisseloord Studios
 Photography: Roy Tee
 Artwork: Theo Stapel

Charts and certifications

Weekly charts

Year-end charts

Certifications

References

External links
The official Ten Sharp website

1991 debut albums
Ten Sharp albums